Buffalo High School is located in Buffalo, Minnesota, Minnesota, United States off the intersection of County Road 35 and Dague Avenue.  There are three communities that contribute students: Buffalo, Minnesota, Hanover, Minnesota, and Montrose, Minnesota, which has helped BHS grow into a large school of 2,145 students starting in the 2022-23 school year, with a staff of approximately 400.

History
Like many other high schools in the area, Buffalo High School (BHS) has moved from building to building as enrollment figures have grown. Education in the Buffalo area started in what is now the local theater. As time went on, what is now the Discovery Elementary School became the high school. Enrollment again rose in the 1970s, and the school was moved to a new building off Highway 25. Suburbanization eventually impacted Buffalo, and in 1994 a referendum for a new school east of town was approved. It was not until 1997 that the new building opened. With the opening, the previous high school building became the Buffalo Community Middle School (BCMS). The former middle school building became Discovery Elementary, which also now houses the District 877 administration offices.

2005–06
 The long-awaited Bison Activity Center is finished in February after nearly two years of construction.
 After completing the season with a 22-2 record, the Buffalo Mock Trial team finishes second at the state competition in Rochester, Minnesota.
 Buffalo's Knowledge Bowl team takes third at the state competition in Brainerd, Minnesota.
 One Act Play receives a star performance at the state competition for "The Elephant Man"
 Lee Kjesbo (BHS Band Director) is honored as a Minnesota Music Educator of the Year by the Minnesota Music Educators Association.

2006–07
 The Bison Boys Basketball team won the school's first ever state athletic team title, beating Robbinsdale Armstrong in the Class 4A final at Target Center.
 The Buffalo Mock Trial team returned to state and claimed the state title, defeating White Bear Lake in the championship round. Buffalo went on to place 17th at the national tournament.

2008–09
 The Bison Boys Track team won the 2009 Boys AA Track Title.

2010-11
 Journalism teacher Ryan McCallum wins the Minnesota Journalism Teacher of the Year award.
 The website for the school newspaper The Hoofprint won the online Pacemaker Award
 Michael Walsh (BHS Choir Director) is honored as a Minnesota Music Educator of the Year by the Minnesota Music Educators Association.

2013-14
 Buffalo's Knowledge Bowl team won the 2014 AA State Title at the Minnesota State Knowledge Bowl Meet in Brainerd.

2016-17
The One Act Play went to the state competition for the fourth year in a row with their show "Amber Waves".

School day
BHS offers many courses for students to choose from. 150 total classes are offered, 5 of which are AP classes. The school day begins at 8:50 and ends at 3:25, using a block schedule of four class periods.

School building
Construction for the current building began in 1995 and finished in the winter of 1997. BHS was the newest high school in the county until Monticello High School was built and finished in 1999, and STMA completed their new high school in 2009. A 2014 bond issue elected to build a 3,500 seat capacity football field, a track, and three practice fields. The work was completed prior to the 2016-17 school year. The bond issue also passed an expansion to the Performing Arts Center, multiple new classrooms, and a new gymnasium.

The 1,000 seat Performing Arts Center is used for a wide range of high school and community performances.

Bison Activity Center
Finished in the beginning of 2006, the field house is the largest of its kind in Minnesota, offering an indoor track (7.3 laps = 1 mile), 36 basketball hoops, 8 retractable curtain walls, retractable baseball pitching nets, batting cages, and 6 retractable tennis nets.

State Ranking
Currently the Buffalo High School building stands as the 3rd largest school building in the state by area, after Wayzata High School in Plymouth, Minnesota and St. Michael-Albertville High School in Albertville, Minnesota.

Arts Magnet
For the 2005-2006 school year, Buffalo High School opened a school within a school with their "Arts Magnet" program. The program is designed to harbor artistically-inclined students with a unique program which plays to their strengths in visual, performance, and literary, media, and applied arts. Students take arts-infused science and English classes as a part of their core curriculum as well as performing in showcases in their freshman and senior years. During the popular senior showcase, students present a culmination of their arts experience in a capstone project. The graduating class of 2022 was the last class of the Arts Magnet program.

Music Program
The Buffalo High School music program has many different classes including band and choir that offer three different levels of participation (Freshman, Varsity, and Concert) and also two orchestras: Varsity and Concert Orchestra. Freshman Band and Choir are for freshmen only. Varsity Band and Choir are for all sophomores and those that still want to be in music but are not in the auditioned Concert Band or Choir. The Varsity Orchestra is for all freshmen and those who wish to continue in orchestra but are not in the auditioned Concert Orchestra. Course offerings also include Music in America, Classical Music Listening and AP Music THeory.

Along with these, Buffalo High School also offers opportunities to be involved in music outside the classroom. For band they offer Jazz I, II, and III with Jazz III reserved for freshman (though upperclassmen can join if they so choose), Jazz I is for junior and senior auditions only, and Jazz II is for everyone else in between. They also offer membership in symphonic orchestra which is available on a needed basis and is usually given to members of Concert Band. In the summer they offer The Herd  Marching Band. This is a non-audition marching band that travels throughout the state of Minnesota during the summer. Every other year this band will take a trip to a destination in the United States or Canada.
For those involved in Choir they offer BHS Singers, Treble Singers, Varsity Singers, and Freshman Singers. All the choir ensembles must be auditioned for.
In 2010, a new after-school program, Chamber Orchestra, was started for students in Orchestra by director Mike Knutson. This new group is audition only and consists of students from all grades. 
The Buffalo High School Music program has received numerous awards throughout its existence. In 2011 both the Concert Choir and Concert Band were chosen to perform at the Minnesota Music Educators Association (MMEA) Clinic. It was prestigious for one group to be chosen, but Buffalo High had two groups chosen. In the spring of 2012 the Concert Choir was selected to perform at Orchestra Hall in the Choral Arts Finale and in the fall of 2012 they were selected to perform at the ACDA-MN Fall Conference. Buffalo High School has placed very highly (Excellent or Superior ratings) at solo and ensemble contests for individuals and also in large group contests. Their Marching Band has won parade contests not only in Minnesota but also in other states such as Virginia and Michigan.
At Buffalo it is possible to join more than one section of music, such as Band and Choir, or Choir and Orchestra.

Student life
BHS offers many leadership roles and opportunities for students through their four years including:
 Students Stepping Up (S.S.U.)
 Student Council
 Class Cabinet
 National Honor Society (N.H.S.)

In addition there are a number of special events.  The school offers a range of clubs and extra-curricular activities.

Athletics
Huge growth in enrollment prompted Buffalo High School to join the Lake Conference, a conference of 7 large suburban high schools west of Minneapolis (Buffalo High School, Eden Prairie High School, Edina High School, Hopkins High School, Minnetonka High School, St. Michael-Albertville High School, and Wayzata High School) and is the 5th largest school in the conference. Prior to joining the Lake Conference in 2019, the Bison competed in the Mississippi 8 Conference and the North Suburban Conference. A full range of sports are offered for both boys and girls.

References

External links
 

Public high schools in Minnesota
Schools in Wright County, Minnesota
Educational institutions in the United States with year of establishment missing
School buildings completed in 1998
Magnet schools in Minnesota